Jakob Philipp Kulik (1793–1863) was an Austrian mathematician known for his construction of a massive factor tables.

Biography

Kulik was born in Lemberg, which was part of the Austrian empire, and is now Lviv located in Ukraine.

Kulik's factor tables

In 1825, Kulik mentioned a table of factors up to 30 million, but this table does no longer seem to exist. It is also not clear if it had really been completed.

From about 1825 until 1863 Kulik produced a factor table of numbers up to 100330200 (except for numbers divisible by 2, 3, or 5). This table basically had the same format as the table to 30 million and it is therefore most likely that the work on the "Magnus canon divisorum" spanned from the mid-1820s to Kulik's death, at which time the tables were still unfinished. These tables fill eight volumes totaling 4212 pages, and are kept in the archives of the Academy of Sciences in Vienna. Volume II of the 8-volume set has been lost.

Works
Jakob Philipp Kulik: De phaenomenis iridis, 1822 link
Jakob Philipp Kulik: Handbuch mathematischer Tafeln, 1824 link
Jakob Philipp Kulik: Divisores numerorum decies centena millia non excedentium, 1825 link
Jakob Philipp Kulik: Lehrbuch der höheren Analysis, 1831 link
Jakob Philipp Kulik: Der tausendjährige Kalender, 1831 link
Jakob Philipp Kulik: Theorie und Tafeln der Kettenlinie, 1832 link
Jakob Philipp Kulik: Sammlung von Tafeln zur Erleichterung des Studiums der Mathematik, und mit Rücksicht ihrer Anwendbarkeit auf Zwecke des praktischen Lebens, 1833 link
Jakob Philipp Kulik: Der tausendjährige Kalender, 1834 (2nd edition) link
Jakob Philipp Kulik: Biographie des Martin Alois David, 1837 link
Jakob Philipp Kulik:  Untersuchungen über die Kettenbrückenlinie, 1838 link
Jakob Philipp Kulik: Tafeln der Quadrat- und Kubikzahlen, 1848 link
Jakob Philipp Kulik: Neue Multiplikationstafeln, 1851 link
Jakob Philipp Kulik: Tafeln der hyperbolischen Sektoren und der Längen elliptischer Bögen und Quadranten, 1851 link
Jakob Philipp Kulik: Über die Tafel primitiver Wurzeln, 1853 link
Jakob Philipp Kulik: Beiträge zur Auflösung höherer Gleichungen überhaupt und der kubischen Gleichungen insbesondere, 1860 link
Jakob Philipp Kulik: Magnus Canon Divisorum, ca. 1825–1863

External links
 A reconstruction of Kulik's main tables can be found on http://locomat.loria.fr
 Archive of the Academy of Sciences in Vienna: http://www.oeaw.ac.at/biblio/en/Archiv/Archiv.html
 

1793 births
1863 deaths
19th-century Austrian mathematicians
Scientists from Lviv